"Suddenly I See" is a song by Scottish singer-songwriter KT Tunstall from her debut studio album, Eye to the Telescope (2004). It was inspired by New York singer and poet Patti Smith, whose album cover for Horses (1975) also inspired Tunstall's album cover for Eye to the Telescope. The song was released on 29 August 2005 as the third single from the album in the United Kingdom. In the United States, it was released as the album's second single on 27 February 2006.

"Suddenly I See" peaked at number 12 on the UK Singles Chart to become Tunstall's highest-charting single in the UK. It also reached number 21 in the United States and is Tunstall's only top-50 hit in Australia, where it charted at number six on the ARIA Singles Chart. The song won Tunstall an Ivor Novello Award in 2006 in the category of Best Song Musically and Lyrically.

Music and lyrics
The song itself is a tribute to "female power", inspired by and about American singer and songwriter Patti Smith. As described in the lyrics, KT Tunstall was inspired to a career in music through looking at a black and white picture of a woman. Admiring her strength and accomplishments, she suddenly realised what she wanted to do with her life. Tunstall stated in an interview that the song was "about Robert Mapplethorpe's photograph of Patti Smith on the cover of Horses". Commenting on the song's later use in The Devil Wears Prada (2006), Tunstall said: "I didn't realize the lyrics could perfectly fit a chick flick, and it could sound like I was singing about wanting to be a fucking model!"

The music has been described as featuring a "chugging rhythm" with a "guitar-bass focused beat", as "compelling", and with "urgency", and having a "shiny production". Although the real focus might be on her "clear vocals", "it's in the growls...that Tunstall truly commands attention". Stylistically, it has been described as a "blues-country-pop hybrid".

Music video
There are three different music videos, one for Britain, one for the US, and one animated. The British version, directed by Big TV!, is a simple performance video in which Tunstall and her band play across from another set of Tunstall and her band. The US version, directed by Patrick Daughters features Tunstall in different situations involving a circus in Romania. Filmed in Bucharest, the video was produced by Black Dog Films and serviced by local production company Domino Productions with producer Catalin Neagu. This version aired for a short time in the US and has seemingly been replaced in rotations by the animated version. The animated version, directed by Honey (i.e., the husband-and-wife directorial team of Laura Kelly and Nicholas Brooks), features Tunstall walking around an animated pop-up fantasy world, and engages in activities such as walking up giant guitars, riding miniature trains, and drifting off into space.

Track listings

 UK CD single 
 "Suddenly I See" (single version) – 3:17
 "Girl and the Ghost" – 3:47

 7-inch single 
A. "Suddenly I See" (single version) – 3:17
B. "Moment of Madness" (live) – 4:38

 UK DVD single 
 "Suddenly I See" (video) – 3:17
 "Miniature Disasters" (live at Glastonbury) – 5:54
 "Get Ur Freak On" (BBC Radio 1 Live Lounge) – 3:18

 European CD single 
 "Suddenly I See" (single version) – 3:17
 "Girl and the Ghost" – 3:47
 "Moment of Madness" – 4:38
 "Get Ur Freak On" (BBC Radio 1 Live Lounge) – 3:18

 Australasian CD single 
 "Suddenly I See" (radio version)
 "Other Side of the World" (radio version)
 "Black Horse and the Cherry Tree" (radio version)
 "Get Ur Freak On" (BBC Radio 1 Live Lounge)

 Digital download
 "Suddenly I See" (single version) – 3:20
 "Suddenly I See" (live from the Mercury Lounge) – 5:25

Credits and personnel
Credits are lifted from the Eye to the Telescope album booklet.

Studios
 Produced at Nam Studios (Bath, Somerset, England)
 Mixed at Metrophonic (London, England)
 Mastered at 360 Mastering (London, England)

Personnel

 KT Tunstall – writing, vocals, guitar
 Arnulf Lindner – baritone guitar, bass
 Luke Bullen – drums, percussion, cajón
 Steve Osborne – production
 Ren Swan – mixing
 Bruno Ellingham – engineering
 Graham Deas – engineering assistance
 Dick Beetham – mastering

Charts and certifications

Weekly charts

Year-end charts

Certifications

Release history

References

External links
 
 Video at Virgin Media

2004 songs
2005 singles
KT Tunstall songs
Music videos directed by Big T.V.
Patti Smith
Relentless Records singles
Songs written by KT Tunstall
Virgin Records singles